Mantador is a city in Richland County, North Dakota, United States. The population was 67 at the 2020 census. Mantador was founded in 1893. It is part of the Wahpeton, ND-MN Micropolitan Statistical Area.

Geography
Mantador is located at  (46.165165, -96.978146).

History
Mantador was established in 1886 by the Soo Line Railroad as a depot under the so-called "Long Length Law." The law required that depots must be placed at nine-mile intervals along the track in order to provide fuel and water for trains and to provide postal service for settlers. The town developed around the depot.

Demographics

2010 census
As of the census of 2010, there were 64 people, 29 households, and 19 families residing in the city. The racial makeup of the city was 92.2% White, 3.1% Native American, 1.6% Asian, and 3.1% from two or more races.

There were 29 households, of which 31.0% had children under the age of 18 living with them, 55.2% were married couples living together, 10.3% had a female householder with no husband present, and 34.5% were non-families. 34.5% of all households were made up of individuals, and 13.8% had someone living alone who was 65 years of age or older. The average household size was 2.21 and the average family size was 2.84.

The median age in the city was 46 years. 23.4% of residents were under the age of 18; 7.9% were between the ages of 18 and 24; 17.3% were from 25 to 44; 45.4% were from 45 to 64; and 6.3% were 65 years of age or older. The gender makeup of the city was 50.0% male and 50.0% female.

2000 census
As of the census of 2000, there were 71 people, 31 households, and 15 families residing in the city. The racial makeup of the city was 100.00% White.

There were 31 households, out of which 38.7% had children under the age of 18 living with them, 48.4% were married couples living together, 3.2% had a female householder with no husband present, and 48.4% were non-families. 48.4% of all households were made up of individuals, and 22.6% had someone living alone who was 65 years of age or older. The average household size was 2.29 and the average family size was 3.50.

In the city, the population was spread out, with 29.6% under the age of 18, 8.5% from 18 to 24, 28.2% from 25 to 44, 18.3% from 45 to 64, and 15.5% who were 65 years of age or older. The median age was 36 years. For every 100 females, there were 97.2 males. For every 100 females age 18 and over, there were 92.3 males.

The median income for a household in the town was $26,875, and the median income for a family was $41,875. Males had a median income of $37,500 versus $0 for females. The per capita income for the city was $14,849. There were no families and 2.9% of the population living below the poverty line, including no under eighteens and 15.4% of those over 64.

Notable people

 Heidi Heitkamp, in 2012 the first woman elected as United States Senator from North Dakota and the second to serve, grew up here

 Cody Mauch, a 2023 NFL Draft prospect grew up here

References

Cities in North Dakota
Cities in Richland County, North Dakota
Populated places established in 1893
1893 establishments in North Dakota
Wahpeton micropolitan area